Senecio sanmarcosensis is a perennial Senecio native to high elevation wetlands in Polylepis racemosa forests in the Callejón de Huaylas in Peru.

References

sanmarcosensis